Journey to the Center of the Earth (released in the UK as Journey to Middle Earth) is a 2008 direct-to-DVD film created by The Asylum and directed by David Jones and Scott Wheeler.

The film is a loose adaptation of the original 1864 novel Journey to the Center of the Earth by Jules Verne, but bears a close similarity to At the Earth's Core, a similar 1914 novel by Edgar Rice Burroughs. It is also the second film by The Asylum to be based on a Jules Verne novel, the first being 30,000 Leagues Under the Sea. A mockbuster, it was released to capitalize on the higher-budgeted film of the same title starring Brendan Fraser.

Plot 

The film follows two intertwined subplots: a drilling operation that is taking place in South America, and a rescue mission to save a research team that has been teleported 600 km beneath the Earth's crust.

The drill, a fully Argentinian project, is powerful enough to send miniature drills through solid rock at a fast pace and is used to try to rescue the team from their fate. The operation begins, but the drills accidentally break through the Earth's crust and into the very mantle of the Earth. This is where the operators encounter hidden dangers awaiting them at the Earth's core. The team has to deal with prehistoric creatures in order to both save the research team and to return safely to the surface of the Earth.

Cast
 Greg Evigan as Joseph Harnet
 Dedee Pfeiffer as Emily Radford
 Vanessa Lee Evigan as Victoria Jansen
 Caroline Attwood as Gretchen Lake
 Amelia Jackson-Gray as Kate Burroughs
 Sara Tomko as Betsey Case
 Vanessa Mitchell as Eve Abraham
 Michael Tower as Marty

See also
 Kola Superdeep Borehole, The deepest hole ever actually drilled into the Earth's crust
 Viaje al centro de la Tierra, Spanish adventure film based on Journey to the Center of the Earth by Jules Verne.

References

External links
Journey to the Center of the Earth at The Asylum
 
Journey to the Center of the Earth official trailer on YouTube

2008 films
2008 direct-to-video films
2008 directorial debut films
2008 independent films
2000s fantasy adventure films
2000s science fiction adventure films
American fantasy adventure films
American independent films
American science fiction adventure films
The Asylum films
Direct-to-video adventure films
Direct-to-video fantasy films
Direct-to-video science fiction films
Films about dinosaurs
Films based on Journey to the Center of the Earth
Films directed by David Jones (Asylum)
Films directed by Scott Wheeler
Mockbuster films
2000s English-language films
2000s American films